Iran uses three official calendar systems, including the Solar Hijri calendar as the main and national calendar, the Gregorian calendar for international events and Christian holidays, and the Lunar Hijri calendar for Islamic holidays.

The surfeit of public holidays has been a subject of concern for almost 30 years. A substantial number of unofficial holidays are added each year to the national holidays that further aggravate the situation.

Iran has the most public holidays in the world with around 25 holidays. The holidays in Iran may differ regarding the Arabic Calendar.

See also
 Student Day (Iran)
 Iranian calendar
 Al-Quds Day, the last Friday before the end of Ramadan 
 Iranian festivals
 List of observances set by the Solar Hijri calendar
 List of observances set by the Islamic calendar

References 

 
Iran
Iranian culture
Society of Iran
Observances set by the Solar Hijri calendar
Holidays